Lusmagh GAA is a Gaelic Athletic Association club located in the townland of Lusmagh, County Offaly, Ireland. The club is almost exclusively concerned with the game of hurling.

Honours

 Offaly Senior Hurling Championship (1): 1989
 Offaly Intermediate Hurling Championship (2): 2012, 2015
 Leinster Junior Club Hurling Championship Runner-Up 2015
 Offaly Junior A Hurling Championship (1) 1973

Notable players
 Brendan Bermingham
 Brendan Kelly
 Eoin Kelly
 Joachim Kelly
 Jim Troy
 John Troy

References

External links
 Lusmagh GAA on GAA Info website

Gaelic games clubs in County Offaly
Hurling clubs in County Offaly